Eugene R. Liebert (1866 – April 27, 1945) was a German American architect who is known for his works in Milwaukee, Wisconsin. Liebert was active designing buildings in the 19th century.

Career
Eugene R. Liebert was born in Germany in 1866. He emigrated to Milwaukee, Wisconsin in 1883, where he found work with a relative in the Trostel & Gallun tannery. The next year, Liebert took a position as a draftsman with Henry C. Koch. When Herman Schnetzky left Koch's office to start his own architectural firm, Liebert followed him as his foreman. In 1891, Liebert was admitted as a partner. Liebert left to form his own architectural office in 1897. Liebert was a popular choice among Milwaukee Germans and his work strongly reflects his home country' style.

Personal
Two of his Liebert 's sons Walter F. and Carl, worked with him. Liebert was active as an architect until his death on April 27, 1945. The Albert O. Trostel House at 3200 North Lake Drive was considered his masterpiece, but it was destroyed following a 1935 fire.

List of works

All buildings are in Milwaukee unless otherwise noted
Eugene R. Liebert House, 1887
Saint John's Evangelical Lutheran Church (Schnetzky & Liebert), 1889
McGeoch Building  (Schnetzky & Liebert), 1890
J. P. Kissinger Block (Schnetzky & Liebert), 1893
Lohman Livery Stable (Schnetzky & Liebert), 1893
Ernst Pommer House (Schnetzky & Liebert), 1895
Germania Building (Schnetzky & Liebert), 1896 (with Schnetzky)
Red Star Yeast Plant addition, 1899
F Mayer Boot and Shoe Company factory 1892-1899
Baumbach Building, 1900
Concordia College Administration Building, 1900
Fred Kraus House, 1902
Henry & Marie Harnischfeger House 1905
Maria Angelorum Chapel, La Crosse, Wisconsin, 1906
Albert O. Trostel House, 1908
St. Michael’s Church (with Schnetzky)
St. Stephen Lutheran School (with Schnetzky)
West Division High School (with Schnetzky)

References

1866 births
1945 deaths
Architects from Milwaukee
German emigrants to the United States